EMEA Masters (formerly known as the European Masters) is a League of Legends tournament organized twice a year by Riot Games. The tournament is the conclusion of each split of the EMEA Regional Leagues. The EMEA Masters is the most important tournament in EMEA for teams outside the League of Legends EMEA Championship franchise.

History

EU LCS and EU CS
Up to and including 2018, the two top leagues in Europe were the European League of Legends Championship Series (EU LCS) and European Challenger Series (EU CS). To get into the EU LCS, one had to first get into EU CS through qualification. You could get into the qualifiers through a previous open qualification or by winning one of the national leagues.
Once you got into EU CS, you had to take one of the first two or three (depending on the season) spots in the play-offs.
After taking the right spot in the EU CS play-offs, the team would qualify for the Promotion Tournament, where it would face one of the weakest teams from the previous EU LCS season for a spot in the elite.

Transition from EU CS to EU Masters
After pressure from some organizations, Riot Games has decided to switch the EU LCS to a franchise model, as well as rebranding the league into the League of Legends European Championship (LEC) from early 2019.
With the transition to a franchise model from 2019, the possibility of promotion to the LEC ceased to exist, making Challenger Series an unnecessary competition.
Nonetheless, there were regional leagues across Europe, which until now offered the chance to climb the European league hierarchy.
With most European organizations left without an international competition (only 10 teams joined the newly formed franchise), it was decided to create a new Champions League-style competition. The competition was called the European Masters (EU Masters), and the best teams from all European Regional Leagues (ERL) would play in it.

Expansion from EU to EMEA
In late 2022, Riot Games announced the expansion of the European region to include the Middle East and North Africa. The League of Legends European Championship franchise was renamed League of Legends EMEA Championship, and the European Masters was renamed EMEA Masters.
With the expansion of the region, the Arabian League and Turkish Championship League were added to the EMEA Masters ecosystem. The format of the tournament itself has not changed.

List of EMEA Regional Leagues

List of European Masters/EMEA Masters finals

References

League of Legends competitions